The 1971 Drexel Dragons football team was an American football team that represented Drexel University as an independent during the 1971 NCAA College Division football season. In their third year under head coach Sterling Brown, the team compiled an overall record of 2–6.

Schedule

References

Drexel
Drexel Dragons football seasons
Drexel Dragons football